The Embassy of Syria in Berlin is the diplomatic mission of the Syrian Arab Republic in Germany. It is located at Rauchstraße 25 in Berlin.

Germany expelled the ambassador for the Syrian Arab Republic in May 2012, and expelled the remaining four embassy staff later that year.
It was reopened in 2020 and now operates normally with representation at the chargé d'affaires level.

Building
The villa at Rauchstrasse 25 is the only building in the block that survived bomb warfare in WW2 and post-war reconstruction. The City Palace was built in 1912 according to plans by Georg Albert Rathenau and Friedrich August Hartmann in neoclassical style. The building has a basement, two full floors and a converted attic with dormer windows under the mansard roof. Wide pilasters made of shell limestone, which are decorated with architectural decorations, rise above the low basement. The central axis of the façade is designed as a central avant-corps that curves towards the street and is closed off by a balcony on the top floor.

The building was remodeled in 2002/2003 and now houses the Syrian Embassy. The architect of the conversion was Abdalrahman Mahamid. The representative rooms are on the first full floor, offices and administration one floor above. An extension was added to the old building.

See also
List of diplomatic missions in Germany
Germany–Syria relations

References

Germany–Syria relations
Syria
Berlin